John Jones (17 April 1925 – 8 March 2016) was a British water polo player. He competed at the 1948 Summer Olympics then captained the 1952 Summer Olympics and the 1956 Summer Olympics teams.

References

1925 births
2016 deaths
British male water polo players
Olympic water polo players of Great Britain
Water polo players at the 1952 Summer Olympics
Water polo players at the 1956 Summer Olympics
Sportspeople from Cheltenham